The Glow is a 2002 American made-for-television psychological thriller film directed by Craig R. Baxley and starring Dean Cain, Portia de Rossi, Hal Linden, Dina Merrill and Joseph Campanella. The film originally aired on Fox on August 30, 2002.

Plot
New Yorkers Jackie and Matt Lawrence get married. They are looking for a new apartment. When Matt is ambushed while jogging in the park, three pensioners help him. They give the couple a comfortable but inexpensive apartment with a view of Central Park.

Matt takes out a loan from the seniors.

Shortly after moving in, another young married couple who lived in the same house disappear without a trace. Jackie and Matt find out that the old people kill young people in order to keep themselves alive longer with body substances. Several bodies are found in the basement of the house.

Cast 
 Dean Cain - Matt Lawrence
 Portia de Rossi - Jackie Lawrence
 Hal Linden - Arnold Janusz
 Dina Merrill - Phoebe Janusz
 Joseph Campanella - Ben Goodstein
 Grace Zabriskie - Sylvia Goodstein
 John Gilbert
 Corrine Connely - Miriam
 Ian Downie
 Sabrina Grdevich - Trish
 Jason Blicker
 Kari Matchett - Allison
 Jonas Chernick - Randy

References

External links 

2002 psychological thriller films
2000s mystery films
American psychological thriller films
American mystery films
Films about old age
Films set in apartment buildings
Films set in New York City
Fox network original films
Films directed by Craig R. Baxley
Films scored by Gary Chang
2002 films
2000s American films